
Gmina Sosnowica is a rural gmina (administrative district) in Parczew County, Lublin Voivodeship, in eastern Poland.

Neighbouring gminas
Gmina Sosnowica is bordered by the gminas of Dębowa Kłoda, Ludwin, Stary Brus, Urszulin and Uścimów.

Villages
The gmina contains the following villages having the status of sołectwo: Bohutyn, Górki, Izabelin, Komarówka, Kropiwki, Lejno, Libiszów, Lipniak, Mościska, Nowy Orzechów, Olchówka, Pasieka, Pieszowola, Sosnowica, Sosnowica-Dwór, Stary Orzechów, Turno, Zienki and Zbójno.

References

Polish official population figures 2006

Sosnowica
Parczew County